The LG Rumor (known as the LG Rumour and LG Rumeur in English and French Canadian markets respectively, or LG Scoop in other markets) is a mobile phone released by LG Electronics in September 2007. The phone was available in many different colors, and features a slide-out QWERTY keyboard in addition to the standard 12-button keypad, a 1.3 megapixel camera, and a 176x220 pixel screen. It was the first from the LG Rumor line.

Features
The LG Rumor/LG Scoop is a phone that was released by Sprint Nextel in September 2007. This phone features a QWERTY keyboard that slides out from the right side. 5-way navigation keys are located on the main panel of the phone, but not present on the keyboard. A 176x220 pixel screen rotates as the keyboard is open, but has no contrast controls. The 1.3-megapixel camera lacks an LED flash and a self-portrait mirror but does have negative, sepia, black & white tones, borders and an image enhancer to customize a picture. Basic MP3 playing functions are embedded in this phone, with the capability of expanding music storage via MicroSD card (125 to 1,000 music files depending on file size, encoding method, and card capacity). The music player will not launch unless a card is inserted in the phone, and will not accept a card with the memory that is over 4 GB.

LG Rumor/LG Scoop can be connected with Bluetooth technology, (stores up to 20 Bluetooth entries), or a proprietary LG USB cable. It can hold 500 contacts with additional numbers, notes and email addresses.

Drawbacks

Commonly occurring issues with the LG Rumor include the device often shutting itself off, no camera flash, the ribbon breaking (causing the image to blur and contort), and the device often not charging. The charge issue is caused by the pins of the connector becoming worn out and bent.

Specifications

Availability
As the LG Rumor/LG Scoop became a popular phone for social teens and for business clients who require basic email support, it is currently sold by CDMA cellphone carriers in North America, such as Sprint, Bell Mobility, Solo Mobile, Virgin Mobile Canada, kajeet, US Cellular, and Alltel (known as LG Scoop).

There are different colors sold by different cellphone providers.

Rumor
 Black (Sprint, Bell, Solo, Virgin, Cricket, US Cellular)
 White (Sprint, Bell, Solo, Virgin, Cricket, US Cellular)
 Lime Green (Sprint, Cricket, Virgin)
 Orange (Solo)
 Blue (Virgin, Sprint, Cricket)
 Purple (Carolina West Wireless)
Scoop
 Turquoise (Alltel)
 Lavender (Alltel, Virgin)
 Red (Alltel)
 Slate/Black (Alltel)
 Citrus/Orange (Alltel)
 Grey (Carolina West Wireless)

See also 
 LG Rumor
 LG Rumor 2

References

Rumor
Mobile phones introduced in 2007